Arozarena is a surname. Notable people with the surname include:

Rafael Arozarena (1923–2009), Spanish poet and novelist
Raiko Arozarena (born 1997), Cuban footballer
Renny Arozarena (born 1971), Cuban actor
Randy Arozarena (born 1995), Cuban baseball player